Shinnie is a surname. Notable people with the surname include:

 Andrew Shinnie (born 1989), Scottish footballer
 Graeme Shinnie (born 1991), Scottish footballer, brother of Andrew
 Peter Shinnie (1915–2007), British archaeologist and Africanist